Oberea okinawana is a species of beetle in the family Cerambycidae. It was described by Kasukabe in 1992.

References

okinawana
Beetles described in 1992